Day in the life (or a day in the life, or day in the life of) is a genre of storytelling in which the events occurring in the life of the subject or subjects are those occurring in single day of their life. 

Such storytelling is sometimes used as a form of journalism, where "[a] day-in-the-life story records the activities of someone through a period of time—such as the length of a day. The videojournalist shoots everything in hopes of capturing revealing details". The genre can be used to give the reader or viewer the sense of a typical day in the life of the subject without actually taking a day to present this material:

Although a day in the life story may present a distinct crisis arising and being dealt with, "some of the writers of these stories feel they are an exploration into the human condition and relationships, that a day in the life of a character, without a Climax and Resolution, is just as valid a storytelling model". A "day in the life" story could therefore also be a slice of life story, depicting the routine events of the life of the subject, although a slice of life story is not necessarily restricted to events occurring in the course of a single day.

See also
 List of media set within one day
 :Category:Novels set in one day
 Slice of life

References

Genres